The Jennings series is a collection of novels written by Anthony Buckeridge (1912–2004) as children's literature about the humorous escapades of J.C.T. Jennings, a schoolboy at Linbury Court preparatory school in England. There are 24 novels in the series, excluding reprints and other material. The first of the series, Jennings Goes to School, appeared in 1950, and new titles were published regularly until the mid-1970s (including Jennings at Large, published in 1977, the only novel to feature Jennings during the school holidays). The two final volumes were published in the 1990s: Jennings Again in 1991, and That's Jennings  in 1994. The characters were originally created for radio and appeared in a regular series on Children's Hour from the late 1940s.

The first ten novels in the series were reprinted in the UK in paperback, by Armada Books, in the late 1960s; and many of the novels were translated from the original English into foreign languages. Quite often, the character's name was not retained: when published in France, Jennings' name was changed to "Bennett"; in Norway he was known as "Stompa"; and in Brazil, when published during the 1970s, the character's name became "Johnny".

Style
Much of the humour rests on misunderstandings attributable to Jennings's literal-mindedness and impetuosity. In the earliest novels in the series there are some Latin puns (typically omitted from later reprints), but Buckeridge discontinued these, apparently to maximise their appeal.  The earlier novels present an idealised version of rural or small-town, middle-class English life in the years between the Second World War and the social revolution of the 1960s; the later ones are still rooted in this era (as Buckeridge admitted) but reflect the changing times surprisingly well. Unlike many of his fans, Buckeridge tended to prefer his later books to his earlier ones, possibly because he was a man of the Left and had more positive political memories of the post-1964 period; when the books were reprinted in paperback in the late 1980s, he chose some of the later books for early publication ahead of those originally written in the 1950s.

The stories invented some vernacular language for the boys to use. In particular they coined the word "ozard". The post-war slang "wizard" generally meant "good" or "very good". "Ozard" derives from "Wizard of Oz" and was used to describe anything the boys disliked or dreaded. It was also used to describe the anger of Mr. Wilkins, which could be "ozard", "ozard squared" and occasionally "ozard cubed".

Characters
J. C. T. (John Christopher Timothy) Jennings – son of a businessman whose home is at Haywards Heath in the stockbroker belt. He is good-natured and well-meaning, but his tendency to act on impulse results in him frequently getting into trouble. Buckeridge told BBC reporter Michael Crick that the fictional Jennings had been modelled on a schoolfriend, Diarmaid Jennings (1913–2009).
C. E. J. (Charles Edwin Jeremy) Darbishire – mild-mannered and short-sighted, the son of a clergyman, the Reverend Percival Darbishire, from whom he has inherited a habit of sententiously citing proverbs (generally prefixed with "My father says..."). Darbishire is Jennings's right-hand man. Inherently more cautious than his best friend, he usually finds himself drawn into situations in which he would rather not be involved.
Venables, Atkinson, Temple, Bromwich (Major) – all are classmates of Jennings in Form 3, and fellow boarders, who share Dormitory 4 with Jennings and Darbishire. Temple's nickname was Bod, by a tortuous schoolboy logic involving his initials: CAT (Charles A Temple), was changed to DOG, then amended to 'Dogsbody', which was finally shortened to 'Bod'.
Pettigrew, Marshall – day boys in Jennings' form, whose privileges Jennings frequently "borrows" in order to assist him in bending school rules.
Binns Minor, Blotwell – shrill-voiced first-formers who are treated with the condescension appropriate to their junior years by Jennings and his contemporaries.
Mr L. P. (Lancelot Phineas) Wilkins (Old Wilkie) – Jennings's form master, a man of limited patience and a volcanic temperament, redeemed by a hidden heart of gold at least once in every book. His catchphrases, both of them frequently uttered in order to express his anger and frustration at the boys' antics, are, "Doh! You silly little boy!" and "...I - I - Corwumph!"
Mr Michael Carter – Jennings's housemaster, a friendly man of great imperturbability and patience, with a phenomenal and unfortunate ability to detect dissembling and violations of school rules. Nicknamed "Benedick", from his use of the Latin phrase "benedicto, benedicatur" (the second word sounding like "Benedick Carter"). This character was said by Buckeridge to be based on himself. Mr Carter is frequently obliged to reassure the less-understanding Old Wilkie that the boys' behaviour is not generally quite as outlandish as the latter thinks - his statement at the end of 'Jennings in Particular' sums it up quite appropriately: "Don't worry, Wilkins. Even third-formers grow up to be people".
Mr M. W. B. (Martin Winthrop Barlow) Pemberton-Oakes (The Archbeako) – the headmaster, a classical scholar with a capacity to command immediate discipline and frequently long-winded in his speeches, although he generally remains reserved and softly spoken, and never hesitates to deliver praise when it is due.
Mr Hind – Music master, mild of manner (though occasionally acerbic), trailing clouds of smoke from his cherrywood pipe – also teaches art to Form 1.
Mr Topliss – teaches shooting once a week on a shooting range behind the gymnasium.
Matron – the school matron: she is sympathetic and understanding, but, like Mr Carter, has a keen ability to spot malingerers. This matron appears from 'Jennings' Little Hut' onwards. Her predecessor, who features most prominently in 'Jennings Goes To School', is also kind-hearted, but less popular with the boys, as she is rather more brisk and no-nonsense in her approach and has, in Buckeridge's words, 'little sympathy with junk-filled pockets and hair that will not stay parted'.
Miss Angela Birkenshaw (Aunt Angela) – Jennings's absent-minded but generous aunt, who sometimes comes to visit Jennings on half-term holidays. In the book "Jennings at Large", she is revealed to be a social worker.

Most of the first names of characters have been revealed (John Christopher Timothy Jennings; Charles Edwin Jeremy Darbishire; Graham Venables; Robin Atkinson; Charles Temple, etc.), but true to the form of British boarding schools, they generally are known exclusively by their surnames. Similarly, the masters too generally address one another by their surnames.

Minor recurring characters:

Hawkins (Old Nightie) – the night watchman.
Robinson (Old Pyjamas/Old Robbo) – the oddjob man. His nickname is obviously a pun on the nightwatchman's nickname of Old Nightie (a shortening of nightgown).
Lieutenant General Sir Melville Merridew DSO MC Bart – retired general, the school's most distinguished alumnus, and frequent bestower of half-holidays.
Miss Thorpe – tireless voluntary charitable worker within the Linbury community.
PC Herbert Honeyball – Linbury's gruff but kind-hearted village policeman, who has more than once had wearying encounters with Jennings and his classmates.
Mr and Mrs Lumley – She runs the local cafe and is renowned for her excellent cakes and doughnuts, while her husband is less renowned as a repairer of bicycles. Noted for the sign outside the shop: "Home-made cakes and bicycles repaired".
Mr Herbert Higgins – mild-mannered local jeweller and watch-mender.
Farmer Jim and Mrs Arrowsmith – owners of a farm adjoining the school grounds. Both are generally easy-going and supportive of the school's activities, but do occasionally get annoyed when their lives are adversely affected by the boys' antics.
Dr Basil Featherstonehaugh Hipkin – an absent-minded zoologist who meets Jennings and Darbishire when they accidentally push him into the river while they are on an illicit boating expedition.
Mrs Amanda Hipkin – Dr Hipkin's formidable but kind-hearted wife.
Miss Margaret Wilkins – Old Wilkie's pleasant and attractive younger sister, a London-based nurse, who occasionally visits her brother and nearly always has him wrapped round her little finger, especially when she needs him to look after her Siamese kitten, Pyewacket.
Mr Arthur Jennings – Jennings's kindly and jovial uncle, who appears in 'Our Friend Jennings' and treats both Jennings and Darbishire to a memorable meal involving lots of baked beans in between courses, but is unfortunately too busy to stay long beyond that.
George the Third – Matron's cat, a large ginger tom.
Mrs Caffey – Linbury Court's housekeeper; pronounced Café, hence nicknamed "Mother Snackbar".
Mrs Connie Hackett – the school's feisty part-time kitchen assistant.
Mr 'Pinky' Parkinson – mild-mannered sports teacher at the nearby Bracebridge School; Linbury Court frequently play Bracebridge in football matches.
Mr 'Foxy Type' Fox – a notoriously strict and hatchet-faced teacher, who is also at Bracebridge.

List of novels

Radio
Jennings and his friends originally appeared on radio, the first play appearing on Children's Hour on the BBC Home Service in 1948. The early books were largely based on the radio scripts. The signature tune was The Old Clockmaker by Charles Williams. "Jennings Goes to School" and "Jennings Again!" were adapted for radio by Anthony Buckeridge, and read by Stephen Fry.  The adaptations were released on audio cassette in 1991.  "Jennings' Little Hut" was broadcast on BBC Radio 4 in 2010, narrated by Mark Williams.

Television
There have been two BBC TV series based on the books, Jennings at School, which ran for ten thirty-minute episodes between 6 September and 8 November 1958, and Jennings, which ran for six episodes between 5 September and 10 October 1966. Jennings was played by John Mitchell in the first series, and by David Schulten in the second. No episodes of either series are known to have survived in the BBC archives or elsewhere.

John Mitchell later found fame as Mitch Mitchell, drummer in The Jimi Hendrix Experience. https://www.theguardian.com/music/2008/nov/14/obituary-mitch-mitchell-hendrix-drummer

Stage adaptation 
In 1980, there was a stage play called Jennings Abounding! (not based on the novel of that title) aimed at the schools market. Described as a comedy with music, with book and lyrics by Anthony Buckeridge, music by Hector Cortes and William Gomez, and additional music and arrangement by Nigel Carver.

Foreign versions
The novels proved popular in other countries; in Germany Jennings is Fredy, and in France he became Bennett. Jennings was especially popular in Norway, where the main character became Stompa and the novels were rewritten with Norwegian locations. There was also a series of Norwegian film adaptations directed by Nils Reinhardt Christensen.

References

External links
ANTHONY BUCKERIDGE and Jennings
Author/Publisher, Jennings enthusiast
Article discussing the appeal of Jennings stories
 Diarmaid Jennings - Daily Telegraph obituary

Book series introduced in 1950
British children's novels
British novels adapted into films
Fictional people from Haywards Heath
Novel series
Novels set in elementary and primary schools
Series of children's books